Kenneth Anthony Wright (East Tuddenham, 5 June 1899 – London, 15 January 1975) was a British composer and conductor.

Life 
Wright studied mechanical and electrical engineering at the University of Sheffield in Sheffield. As a technician he got a job with the British Broadcasting Corporation (BBC) and from 1922 to 1959 he was a member of the music department of the BBC in London. In 1922 he became the first director of the BBC in Manchester. From 1923 to 1930 he became personal assistant to Percy Pitt.  From 1930 to 1937 he was the personal assistant to Sir Adrian Boult. He went on to conduct BBC orchestras, was Overseas Music Director (1940-3), Deputy Director Of Music (1944-7) and Acting Director in 1947 for a time after Victor Hely-Hutchinson's death, Artists' Manager (1948–51) and Head of TV Music from 1951 to 1959. After reaching the BBC compulsory retirement age of 60, he was the director of the Robert Maxwell Film Companies.

As a conductor and composer he played wind music and had pieces dedicated to him, including A Downland Suite by John Ireland. He composed works for various ensembles, such as orchestras, wind bands (military bands), brass bands and wrote works until shortly before his death.

Compositions

Works for orchestra 
 Bohemia, fantasy
 Daddy Long-Legs
 Dainty Lady, intermezzo
 Dancing with the Daffodils 
 Perky Pizzicato, for strings
 Scherzo - on a Newfoundland song
 The Killigrew's Soirée
 Tobacco Suite
 Military Shag, march
 Old Havana, tango
 Snuff, scherzo
 Virginia, lullaby
 Irish Twist

Works for wind orchestras and brass bands 
 1935 Pride of Race, suite  ( featured at the National Brass Band Championships in 1935 and at the Open Brass Band Championships in 1945)
 1936 Homage to Liszt
 1938 Irish Merry
 1944 Peddars' Way
 1968 Dancing Valley
 1968 The Killigrew's Soirée
 1971 A Rhapsody for Leicastershire

Chamber music 
 The Brushwood Squirrel, for violin and piano

Works for Piano 
 Six Fantasy Pictures from a Pantomime, suite

References

1899 births
1975 deaths
English conductors (music)
British male conductors (music)
20th-century British composers
English male classical composers
Alumni of the University of Sheffield
BBC music executives
Musicians from Norfolk
20th-century British conductors (music)
20th-century British male musicians
BBC Orchestras